Shawn Mortensen (November 14, 1965—April 15, 2009) was an American art photographer and photojournalist. He was famous for his characteristic, and often-imitated, style.

His subjects included Keith Haring, The Beastie Boys, Biggie Smalls, Kate Moss, and the Sex Pistols.

References 

20th-century American photographers
1965 births
2009 deaths